Julius Laurens Clarke (November 13, 1828 – November 22, 1907) was an American newspaper publisher and politician who served as Massachusetts Auditor, and as Massachusetts' Insurance Commissioner.

Clarke was born in Chatham, Connecticut, in an area that became Portland, Connecticut.

In 1845 Clarke started the first daily newspaper in Worcester, Massachusetts. The Worcester Transcript was started on the June 9, 1845.

References

Bibliography
 Boston Daily Globe, JULIUS L. CLARKE DEAD. Ex-State Auditor and Insurance Commissioner of Massachusetts. Page 32 (Nov 24, 1907).
 New York Times, Julius L. Clarke, Page 9 (November 24, 1907).
 Singer, Isidore: The International Insurance Encyclopedia CLARKE, JULIUS LAURENS page 155 (1910).

Footnotes

 
 

 

State auditors of Massachusetts
1828 births
1907 deaths
19th-century American newspaper publishers (people)
American male journalists
Politicians from Worcester, Massachusetts
Politicians from Newton, Massachusetts
Writers from Worcester, Massachusetts
Massachusetts Republicans
Businesspeople from Worcester, Massachusetts